João Oliveira may refer to:

João Oliveira (footballer, born 1906) (1906–?), Portuguese footballer
João Paulo de Oliveira (born 1981), Brazilian racing driver
João Paulo Oliveira (born 1985), Brazilian footballer
João Oliveira (footballer, born 1992), Portuguese footballer
João Oliveira (volleyball) (born 1995), Portuguese volleyball player
João Oliveira (Swiss footballer) (born 1996), Swiss footballer
João Oliveira (footballer, born 1998), Portuguese footballer